Micromonospora andamanensis is a Gram-positive bacterium from the genus Micromonospora which has been isolated from the sponge Xestospongia near Phuket, Thailand.

References

External links
Type strain of Verrucosispora andamanensis at BacDive -  the Bacterial Diversity Metadatabase	

Micromonosporaceae
Bacteria described in 2013